Nádraží Veleslavín (English: Veleslavín Station) is a station on Line A of the Prague Metro, located in Veleslavín, Prague 6. It opened on 6 April 2015, together with Bořislavka, Petřiny and Nemocnice Motol stations.

History
Nádraží Veleslavín station opened on 6 April 2015. Initially, the station did not have escalator leading to the vestibule to the street, so people arriving to or going from the airport had to be helped by special staff. In 2017 a decision was made to build additional escalators at a cost of 33 million Czech crowns.

The planned name for the station was initially just Veleslavín. Authorities later changed it to the current station name, due to it being next to the Praha-Veleslavín station as well as for the nearby tram and bus stop stops of the same name.

General information
The station is adjacent to the Praha-Veleslavín railway station and a bus terminal which became the new terminus of the 119 bus line from Václav Havel Airport and regional buses towards Kladno. The station is 20m below ground level. The station was designed by architect Hana Vermachová.

Gallery

References

Prague Metro stations
Railway stations opened in 2015
2015 establishments in the Czech Republic
Prague 6
Railway stations in the Czech Republic opened in the 21st century